Sulfoacetaldehyde reductase (ISFD) is an enzyme with systematic name isethionate:NADP+ oxidoreductase. This enzyme catalyses the following chemical reaction

 isethionate + NADP+  2-sulfoacetaldehyde + NADPH + H+

This enzyme catalyses the reaction in the reverse direction.

References

External links 
 

EC 1.1.1